Youssef Riener (born 10 April 1986) is an Austrian ice hockey player currently playing for EHC Black Wings Linz of the Austrian Hockey League.

Riener began his career with Wiener EV before moving to EC Red Bull Salzburg.  He moved to Black Wings Linz in 2006 where he has become a regular member of their blueline.  He has also represented Austria in the World Junior Championship.

External links
 

1986 births
Austrian ice hockey defencemen
EC Red Bull Salzburg players
EHC Black Wings Linz players
Living people
Wiener EV players
Place of birth missing (living people)